This is a list of amphibians found in Morocco. 12 amphibian species are recorded in Morocco.

Species list

See also
 List of amphibians of India

References 

Amphibians
Morocco
Amphibians
Morocco